The Seine is a river in France.

Seine River may also refer to:

Rivers
 Seine River (Ontario)
 Seine River (Manitoba)
 St. Marys River (Florida–Georgia), named the Seine River in 1652 by French explorer Jean Ribault, later renamed by the Spanish.

Other uses
 Seine River (electoral district), a provincial electoral district in Manitoba
 Seine River First Nation, an Ojibwe nation in Ontario